David John Chapman (born 21 August 1936) is a British middle-distance runner. He competed in the men's 3000 metres steeplechase at the 1960 Summer Olympics. He also represented England in the 3,000 metres steeplechase at the 1962 British Empire and Commonwealth Games in Perth, Western Australia.

References

1936 births
Living people
Athletes (track and field) at the 1960 Summer Olympics
British male middle-distance runners
British male steeplechase runners
Olympic athletes of Great Britain
Place of birth missing (living people)
Athletes (track and field) at the 1962 British Empire and Commonwealth Games
Commonwealth Games competitors for England